"Are U Still Down" is a song co-written and performed by American contemporary R&B singer Jon B, issued as a single from his second studio album Cool Relax. It was commissioned as a double single with "They Don't Know" in some markets, including the United States. The song features a rap by American hip hop musician 2Pac; and it was the final rap verse that 2Pac recorded before his death.

"Are U Still Down" was produced by Johnny J. As a tribute to Tupac, in 2004, 8 years after the rappers death, Jon B. recorded "Are U Still Down, Part. 2" with the original producer. Johnny J also had plans to release unreleased Tupac records. In part 2, Tupac's lyrics are sampled from his song Happy Home  which was a part of his Until The End Of Time Album, released on March 27, 2001 4.5 years after his death.

"Are U Still Down" peaked at number 29 on the Billboard Hot 100 and number two on the R&B chart in 1998.

Music video

A music video was commissioned for the song, directed by Tim Story.

Chart positions

Year-end charts

Certifications

References

External links
 
 

1996 songs
1998 singles
Jon B. songs
Tupac Shakur songs
Music videos directed by Tim Story
Song recordings produced by Johnny "J"
Song recordings produced by Tupac Shakur
Songs written by Jon B.
Songs written by Johnny "J"
Songs written by Tupac Shakur